Star Wars: Rebel Assault is a rail shooter video game developed and published by LucasArts for DOS, Macintosh, Sega CD and 3DO Interactive Multiplayer systems, set in the Star Wars universe. Released in 1993, it is the first CD-ROM-only game to be published by LucasArts. The game's story focuses on a young pilot called Rookie One as they are trained by, and subsequently fights for, the Rebel Alliance in the Galactic Civil War.

The game features digitized footage and music from the original movies (although most of the original footage is replaced by CGI rendered sequences), and full speech. Rebel Assault is one of the oldest titles to make use of extensive full-motion video (FMV) on the PC. The video was used to display pre-rendered 3D graphics that were far ahead of what a contemporary PC could render in real-time. Developers pre-rendered various environments and battles and the player flew through these environments.

Gameplay
The game consists of four mission types: three spaceflight types, and one on foot. The three spaceflight mission types are third person (levels 1, 3, 5, 7, and 11), overhead view (levels 1 and 13), and first person (levels 2, 4, 5, 6, 8, 10, 12, 14, and 15). In all three types, the ship generally follows the same cursor which aims its gunfire. If the player moves the targeting cursor after firing, the shots that were already fired will follow the cursor. 9 of the 15 levels are first person, which has movement more restricted than in other modes. As such, enemy fire cannot be dodged in this mode; instead, the player must shoot the enemy within a set time frame in order to avoid taking damage, much like in a light gun game. Only level 9 falls into the on foot mission type. This level puts the player in a series of three stationary settings, though the player character can be maneuvered horizontally in order to avoid enemy fire. In a few stages, there are branching points, much like those in Panzer Dragoon II. Bonus points are awarded for accuracy and whether secondary objectives are accomplished.

In some cases, original footage was filmed for the game with actors, and a Star Destroyer model was digitized (a mini camera 'flew' around it) for a certain mission. Most of the graphics were prerendered in 3D.

Story
The game follows the adventures of a young pilot known only as Rookie One, a moisture farmer from Tatooine in the style of Luke Skywalker. The game largely takes place during the events of Episode IV: A New Hope; however, the sequences on Hoth from The Empire Strikes Back are included.

The game begins with Rookie One's training, followed by an attack on the Star Destroyer Devastator, after its capture of the Tantive IV in the events of the film. The rebel squad then defends the Rebel base on Hoth from the attack shown in the Empire Strikes Back, and finally launches an assault on the Death Star, with the player taking the place of Luke Skywalker in destroying the battle station. Each of the 15 chapters features its own brief "alternate ending" clip which plays if the player runs out of lives and therefore fails the mission.

All of the original characters are replaced by new characters and voices, and in some cases, new situations. For example, Han Solo and the Millennium Falcon are replaced by Rebel Commander Jake Farrell in an A-wing who saves Rookie One just before he has to take the final shot on the Death Star.

The game was followed by Star Wars: Rebel Assault II: The Hidden Empire.

Version differences
The Sega CD version is missing Chapter 7 (Imperial Probe Droids) and skips straight to Chapter 8 (Imperial Walkers), renumbering all subsequent chapters accordingly. The Sega CD version's graphics are also considerably less sharp and detailed than those of the PC and 3DO versions, and it also lacks the possibility to play as a female Rookie One.

Reception and sales

Star Wars: Rebel Assault was a commercial hit. LucasArts shipped 110,000 units to retailers in the game's first day, and global sales reached 400,000 units by mid-1994. By summer 1994, this number rose to 500,000 units. The game sold 1.5 million copies.

Computer Gaming World in February 1994 said of the DOS version that "In some ways, Rebel Assault is a breathtaking game, yet it comes up a few light sabers short in some key areas". While praising the graphics as "the best yet delivered in a PC action game", the reviewer complained that the story "essentially replays several scenes from the movie" even though the plot "required a knowledge of the movies to make sense of it". Gameplay was "an odd mix of challenging and mindless levels", with enemies attacking in the same easily memorizable patterns. The magazine concluded that "Rebel Assault is a gorgeous, fast-paced shooter that is a lot of fun to play. The problem is, the fun is too short lived" and without replay value. In April 1994 the magazine said that Rebel Assault "seems to have split gamers into two camps—those that absolutely love it, and those that absolutely don't", with some criticizing the "very limited and very repetitive" game play despite "incredible" graphics. The magazine concluded "Come to this one expecting a good show, but be sure your trigger finger knows what your eyes and ears are getting it into".

GamePro gave the Sega CD version a negative review. Though they praised the music, they described the graphics as "grainy, soupy, and very pixelated" and said that the controls are poor enough to all but eliminate the fun factor in the game. Electronic Gaming Monthly scored it a 5.75 out of 10, commenting that the music is excellent but that the graphics suffer from an extremely limited color palette, which even interferes with the gameplay, making it difficult to tell when the player's ship is going to crash into something.

GamePro gave a somewhat more positive review of the 3DO version, praising the audio and the "awesome graphics", but again concluded that the controls all but completely ruin the game. They remarked that the directional movements are twitchy and that the need to push the cursor to the edge of the screen in order to maneuver the ship in first person is a major problem. A reviewer for Next Generation likewise said that the graphics and music are impressive, and the port is overall "a very close conversion of the PC CD-ROM game", but that "The control is none too solid, and game play is rudimentary." He gave it two out of five stars.

Next Generations review of the Macintosh version remarked that the game's recreation of vehicles and scenarios from the Star Wars universe would make it very appealing to fans of the franchise, but that the on-rails gameplay would get old quickly for general gamers. The review also commented on the usual long delay between the release of the PC and Macintosh versions, and scored it two out of five stars.

Rebel Assault was a runner-up for Computer Gaming Worlds Action Game of the Year award in June 1994, losing to Prince of Persia 2: The Shadow and the Flame. The editors wrote that Rebel Assault "established a new record for CD-ROM game sales as well as a new model for action games based on film properties".

MacUser named Rebel Assault one of the top 50 CD-ROMs of 1995.

Entertainment Weekly gave the game a B and wrote that "You've got to hand it to the folks at LucasArts — they wring every drop of juice from a game platform, whether it's PC CD-ROM (where Rebel Assault has been a best-seller for the past eight months) or Sega CD (which is just releasing the same game). The trouble is, Sega CD doesn't have that much juice to begin with: Thanks to the system's slow disc access and limited color capabilities, this version of the Star Wars fighter ship never quite reaches light speed."

References

External links

1993 video games
3DO Interactive Multiplayer games
DOS games
Full motion video based games
Games commercially released with DOSBox
Interactive movie video games
LucasArts games
LucasArts franchises
Classic Mac OS games
Rail shooters
Sega CD games
Star Wars (film) video games
Rebel Assault
The Empire Strikes Back video games
U.S. Gold games
Video games developed in the United States
Video games featuring protagonists of selectable gender
Video games scored by Peter McConnell
Video games with digitized sprites